Anton Vladimirovich Shipilov (born 7 March 1973) is a Russian football coach and a former player.

Shipilov played football for his hometown side FC Fakel Voronezh until he suffered a career-ending injury in 1997.

References

1973 births
Footballers from Voronezh
Living people
Russian footballers
Russia under-21 international footballers
FC Fakel Voronezh players
Russian Premier League players
Association football midfielders